Fighters of the Saddle is a 1929 American silent Western film directed by Robert J. Horner and starring Art Acord, Peggy Montgomery and John Lowell.

Cast
 Art Acord as Dick Weatherby 
 Peggy Montgomery as Nesta Wayne 
 John Lowell as Henry 'Bulldog' Weatherby 
 Tom Bay as Pete - Dick's cousin 
 Jack Ponder as Tom Wayne 
 Betty Carter as Patty Wayne 
 Lynn Sanderson as Art Wayne

References

Bibliography
 Pitts, Michael R. Western Movies: A Guide to 5,105 Feature Films. McFarland, 2012.

External links
 

1929 films
1929 Western (genre) films
Films directed by Robert J. Horner
American black-and-white films
Silent American Western (genre) films
1920s English-language films
1920s American films